TPPD A.Ş. (Türkiye Petrolleri Petrol Dağıtım A.Ş.) operates as a fuel products distribution company which has approx. 300 filling stations in Turkey.

Companies based in Ankara